The 385th Air Expeditionary Group is a provisional United States Air Force unit assigned to Air Mobility Command to activate or inactivate as needed. It was last known to be stationed at Incirlik AB, Turkey. It is currently a tenant unit of the 379th Air Expeditionary Wing at Al Udeid Air Base, Qatar.

During World War II, it was active as the 385th Bombardment Group (Heavy), an Eighth Air Force B-17 Flying Fortress unit, stationed at RAF Great Ashfield, England.  The group led the famous attack on the Focke-Wulf Assembly Plant at Marienburg in East Prussia on 9 October 1943.

During the Cold War, the 385th Strategic Aerospace Wing was a Strategic Air Command (SAC) wing assigned to the 818th Strategic Aerospace Division at Offutt Air Force Base, Nebraska. It conducted strategic air refueling operations and maintained ICBM readiness to meet SAC commitments. The wing served as a deterrent force and also supported SAC's global air refueling mission until inactivated in 1964 as part of the phaseout of the SM-65 Atlas ICBM from the USAF inventory.  It was inactivated on 15 December 1964.

History

World War II

The unit was constituted in late November 1942 as the 385th Bombardment Group and activated on 1 December 1943 at Davis–Monthan Field in Arizona. Its initial squadrons were the 548th, 549th, 550th, and 551st Bombardment Squadrons.

The group was formed in February 1943 at Geiger Field, Washington. It trained for two months and then moved to Great Falls AAB, Montana in April 1943. The unit completed training at the end of May 1943 with the aircraft moving to Kearney AAF, Nebraska prior to moving to England by the northern ferry route. Two aircraft were lost en route. The ground echelon left Great Falls on 8 June 1943. The 548th BS sailed on the Queen Mary on 23 June 1943 and the other squadrons on the Queen Elizabeth on 1 July 1943.

Under Eighth Air Force based in England, the 385th BG operated primarily as a strategic bombardment organization until the war ended, striking such targets as industrial areas, air bases, oil refineries, and communications centers in Germany, France, Poland, Belgium, the Netherlands, and Norway. The group received two Distinguished Unit Citations for bombing an aircraft factory at Regensburg on 17 August 1943 after a long hazardous flight over enemy territory. The group led the 4th Bombardment Wing a great distance through heavy and damaging opposition for the successful bombardment of an aircraft repair plant at Zwickau on 12 May 1944, being awarded another DUC for this performance. Other strategic targets included aircraft factories in Oschersleben and Marienburg, battery works in Stuttgart, airfields in Beauvais and Chartres, oil refineries in Ludwigshafen and Merseburg, and marshalling yards in Munich and Oranienburg.

The 385th sometimes supported ground forces and struck interdictory targets.  It attacked coastal defenses in June 1944 in preparation for the Normandy invasion and hit marshalling yards and choke points during the landing on D-Day. The group bombed enemy positions in support of ground forces at Saint-Lô in July 1944. Attacked German communications and fortifications during the Battle of the Bulge, December 1944 – January 1945.  It bombed troop concentrations and communications centers in Germany and France, March–April 1945, to assist the final thrust into Germany.

On 6 March 1944 raid to Berlin (the most costly mission the Eighth ever carried out) the 3rd Division commander, Brigadier General Russell Wilson, took off from Great Ashfield in a radar-equipped B-17 in a leading group of the 385th. All of the 385th aircraft returned safely ... all, that is, except the one carrying General Wilson. which was seen to take several hits from flak. setting one engine on fire. Although four of the crew managed to parachute to safety (including Medal of Honor hero First Lieutenant John C. Morgan), eight of the others were killed when the bomber exploded.

In May 1945 the group dropped food to the starving Dutch population in the Netherlands as part of Operation Chowhound. The 385th suffered the last enemy action in the European part of the war. On 2 May 1945, a B-17 of the 385th BG was struck by enemy ground fire while on Operation Chowhound but returned safely to base. This was the last credited combat mission of the war.

After V-E Day, the 385th Bomb Group hauled displaced French slave laborers from Austria to France.  It redeployed to the United States in June and August 1945.  The aircraft left between 19 June, and 29 June 1945. the ground unit left on 4 August 1945, and sailed on the Queen Elizabeth from Greenock on 5 August 1945. They arrived in New York on 11 August 1945. Group was then established at Sioux Falls AAF, South Dakota and inactivated on 28 August 1945.

Cold War

The origins of the 385th Strategic Aerospace Wing began on 15 August 1959 when Strategic Air Command (SAC) activated the 566th Strategic Missile Squadron (SMS) at Offutt AFB and assigned it to Second Air Force. The squadron was equipped with SM-65 Atlas-Ds.  Six weeks later, on 1 October 1959, SAC established the 4321st Strategic Wing at Offutt and assigned it to the 17th Air Division (later Strategic Aerospace Division) as an operational headquarters for the 566th and for the 34th Air Refueling Squadron, flying Boeing KC-135 Stratotankers.  The 34th had been stationed at Offutt since the fall of 1958, but was assigned to a wing located at Whiteman AFB, Missouri.

The wing's missiles were maintained on alert and ready for combat. The 4321st (and later the 385th) continued to maintain an alert commitment until inactivating. In August 1962, the 4321st was reassigned to the 818th Strategic Aerospace Division. However, SAC Strategic Wings could not carry a permanent history or lineage and SAC looked for a way to make its Strategic Wings permanent.

In 1962, in order to perpetuate the lineage of many currently inactive bombardment units with illustrious World War II records, Headquarters SAC received authority from Headquarters USAF to discontinue its Major Command controlled (MAJCON) strategic wings that were equipped with combat aircraft and to activate Air Force controlled (AFCON) units, most of which were inactive at the time which could carry a lineage and history.

As a result the 4321st SW was replaced by the newly constituted  385th Strategic Aerospace Wing (SAW), which assumed its mission, personnel, and equipment on 1 January 1963.
In the same way the 549th Strategic Missile Squadron, one of the unit's World War II historical bomb squadrons, replaced the 566th SMS. The 34th Air Refueling Squadron was reassigned to the 385th. Because the new organization controlled a combination of aircraft and intercontinental ballistic missiles it added "Aerospace" to the 4321st's designation.

The 385th SAW continued to conduct strategic air refueling operations and maintain ICBM readiness to meet SAC commitments. The wing served as a deterrent force and also supported SAC's global air refueling mission. It was inactivated on 15 December 1964.

In the 21st century, the 817th Expeditionary Airlift Squadron was part of the group; the 816th EAS may also have been assigned at times.

Lineage
385th Bombardment Group
 Constituted as the 385th Bombardment Group (Heavy) on 25 November 1942
 Activated on 1 December 1942.
 Redesignated as the 385th Bombardment Group, Heavy on 11 August 1944
 Inactivated on 28 August 1945
 Consolidated on 31 January 1984 with the 385th Strategic Aerospace Wing as the 385th Strategic Aerospace Wing (remained inactive)

385th Strategic Wing
 Constituted as the 385th Strategic Aerospace Wing on 15 November 1962 and activated (not organized)
 Organized on 1 January 1963
 Discontinued and inactivated on 15 December 1964
 Consolidated on 31 January 1985 with the 385th Bombardment Group (remained inactive)
 Redesignated 385th Air Expeditionary Group and converted to provisional status, on 12 June 2002.

Assignments
 II Bomber Command, 1 December 1942
 Eighth Air Force, ca. 6 July 1943
 VIII Bomber Command, ca. 8 July 1943
 4th Bombardment Wing (later 4th Combat Bombardment Wing), 12 July 1943 (attached to 401st Provisional Combat Bombardment Wing until 13 September 1943)
 93d Combat Bombardment Wing, 17 February 1945
 45th Combat Bombardment Wing, 24 May 1945
 20th Bombardment Wing, 18 June 1945 – 28 August 1945
 Strategic Air Command, 14 November 1962 (not organized)
 818th Strategic Aerospace Division, 1 January 1963 – 15 December 1964
 Air Mobility Command to activate or inactivate at any time after 12 June 2002

Components
Squadrons
 34th Air Refueling Squadron, 1 January – 15 December 1964 (detached 10–15 December 1964)
 548th Bombardment Squadron, 1 December 1942 – 19 June 1945
 549th Bombardment (later Strategic Missile) Squadron, 1 December 1942 – 19 June 1945; 1 January 1963 – 15 December 1964 (not operational, 1–15 December 1964)
 550th Bombardment Squadron, 1 December 1942 – 19 June 1945
 551st Bombardment Squadron, 1 December 1942 – 19 June 1945
 90th Expeditionary Air Refueling Squadron, 2002-Undetermined
 Squadron assigned to: NSA Souda Bay, Crete, Greece
 817th Expeditionary Airlift Squadron, 2006-c. 1 April 2014

Stations
 Davis–Monthan Field, Arizona, 1 December 1942
 Biggs Field, Texas, 21 December 1942
 Geiger Field, Washington, 1 February 1943
 Great Falls Army Air Base, Montana, 11 April – June 1943
 Great Ashfield (Station 155), England, June 1943 – August 1945
 Sioux Falls Army Air Field, South Dakota,  – 28 August August 1945.
 Offutt AFB, Nebraska, 1 January 1963 – 15 December 1964
 Incirlik Air Base, Turkey, 2002-Undetermined

Aircraft and missiles
 Boeing B-17 Flying Fortress, 1942–1945
 Boeing KC-135 Stratotanker, 1963–1964, 2002-unknown
 SM-65 Atlas D, 1963–1964

References

 Notes

 Citations

Bibliography

 Anderson, Capt. Barry (1985). Army Air Forces Stations: A Guide to the Stations Where U.S. Army Air Forces Personnel Served in the United Kingdom During World War II (PDF). Maxwell AFB, AL: Research Division, USAF Historical Research Center. Archived from the original (PDF) on 4 March 2016. Retrieved 7 July 2012.

Further reading
 Leonard, Lt Col. Marston S. History of the 385th Bombardment Group (Heavy) and its affiliated units 424th Air Service Group, 877th Chemical Company (AO), Detachment 155, 18th Weather Squadron, 1 February 1943 –  14 August 1945. San Angelo, Texas: Newsfoto Publishing Company, 1974.
 Varnedoe, W.W. (Ed.). A New History of the 385th Bomb Group (H). St. Petersburg, Florida: Southern Heritage Press/385th Bombardment Group Memorial Association, 1995. .
 Varnedoe, W. W. The Story of Van's Valiants, A History of the 385th Bomb Group Colonial Graphics, 2005, 6th Edition 2009.

External links
 Friends of the 385th Bomb Group
 Replica WWII 385th BG Briefing Room at U.S. Veterans Memorial Museum

385